Meleager and Atalanta is a 1618 oil on canvas painting by Jacob Jordaens, now in the Royal Museum of Fine Arts Antwerp. He returned to the same subject of Meleager and Atalanta in a 1620-1650 painting, now in the Museo del Prado.

References

1610s paintings
Paintings by Jacob Jordaens
Paintings depicting Greek myths
Paintings in the collection of the Royal Museum of Fine Arts Antwerp
Dogs in art